HMS P39 was a Royal Navy U-class submarine built by Vickers-Armstrong at Barrow-in-Furness.

Sinking 
P39 had a short-lived career with the Royal Navy. She was assigned to operate in the Mediterranean, based in Malta as part of the 10th Flotilla. She was in harbour following a patrol in the area east of Tunisia whilst previous bomb damage was being repaired. She was then further damaged by German bombers. She was considered too badly damaged for repair, and was salvaged, towed to Kalkara and beached in 1943, but again badly damaged by another air attack. Many of the crew were subsequently lost aboard the submarine  on their way home to the United Kingdom. P39 was finally broken up in 1954.

References 
 
 
 
 
 

 

British U-class submarines
Ships built in Barrow-in-Furness
1941 ships
World War II submarines of the United Kingdom
Lost submarines of the United Kingdom
Maritime incidents in March 1942
Submarines sunk by aircraft
Ships sunk by German aircraft